Christian media, sometimes referred to as inspirational, faith and family, or simply Christian, is a cross-media genre that features a Christian message or moral. Several creative studios and mass media formats are considered to be aspects of Christian media, including media organizations, a characteristic film industry, musical genres, radio formats, TV formats, and subgenres.

History
Christian art has long been a tradition of the faith, dating back to early Christian art and architecture and it was a major part of the medieval and renaissance eras. Christian literature similarly dates back to the history of early Christianity, The Shepherd of Hermas was a popular story in the early church. This included depictions of Jesus and parables of Christ figures, as aniconism in Christianity was largely rejected within the ante-Nicene era, since artistic expression helps fulfill the Great Commission. Originally Christian art was created under patronage and tithe, today adapted into contemporary creative media and arts funding techniques. The patron-client relationship is a primary analogue for the relationship between Christian as client with God as patron, and it is basis for the terminology patron saint. Mass media had one of its earliest success with the invention of the printing press and the subsequent printing of The Holy Bible, the Christian Bible is the best-selling book of all time, and the first well received mass printing of it was the Gutenberg Bible. Christian media productions are recognized as a popular film, music, broadcasting, and interactive media format alongside secular counterparts.

Early Christian allegory in works of fiction, such as John Bunyan's The Pilgrim's Progress, made an impact on later works of fiction, including C. S. Lewis' The Chronicles of Narnia and J. K. Rowling's Harry Potter. The Pilgrim's Progress is one of the most commonly referenced Christian allegories in media and art, artist Vincent van Gogh was known to have been inspired by the story. Besides The Pilgrim's Progress, other classic books in the Christian genre include the Divine Comedy, Le Morte d'Arthur, and Paradise Lost, these four novels are depicted in large stained glass windows at Princeton University Chapel. Other books in the Western canon from Christian novels, or those drawing heavy inspiration from Christian concepts, include The Count of Monte Cristo, The Scarlet Letter, Les Misérables, and Bless Me, Ultima. 

This genre's films date back to early cinema with adaptions of Lew Wallace's Ben-Hur: A Tale of the Christ in 1907 and 1925, as well as Cecil B. DeMille's landmark religious film The Ten Commandments (1923), and their popular 1950s remakes The Ten Commandments (1956) and Ben-Hur (1959). Other popular Christian film and television productions include the Superbook anime (1981-1983, and rebooted in 2011-ongoing), VeggieTales animated series (1993-ongoing), The Prince of Egypt (1998), Bruce Almighty (2003), The Passion of the Christ (2004), The Chronicles of Narnia film series (2005-ongoing), God's Not Dead (2014), Duck Dynasty (2012–2017), The Chosen (2017-ongoing), and Jesus Revolution (2023).

Wide-ranging music including hymns, Josquin's "Ave Maria" and Handel's Messiah, are a part of church and gospel music which have a history going back to the early days of recorded music, and contemporary Christian music encompasses several popular music styles including Christian rock, Christian hip hop, contemporary worship music, and Christian electronic dance music. Broadway theatre productions like Jesus Christ Superstar, recorded sermons by preachers of Billy Graham and Martin Luther King Jr., along with Christian radio shows Adventures in Odyssey and Family Theater so too with podcasts produced by the likes of Phil Vischer and Phil Robertson, are sometimes included in this genre.

Characteristics

Themes 

The Christian genre often portrays a focus on the teachings of Jesus, the gospel, ministry as per the Great Commission, and Christian virtues: attributes encompassing love, grace, forgiveness, prudence, justice, temperance, fortitude, faith, hope, and charity, along with messages of resurrection. These codes are often played out through depictions of good and evil through conflicting virtues and vices, or as in the evangelism of The Pilgrim's Progress with individuals seeking personal growth and redemption. This depiction of Christian theology, in the narrative, contrasts sharply with comparatively impersonal institutions leading to some form of moral understanding.

The narrative can be delivered through sermons, retelling Bible stories especially the life of Jesus in the New Testament, or a hero's journey. Witnessing, a term used to describe a personal experience with coming to Christ, is another storytelling method that has been a part of the biographies of historical figures and celebrities alike, including Paul the Apostle, Priscilla and Aquila, Bede, Mary Stone, Hani Motoko, Johnny Cash, Colonel Sanders, Mr. T, Alice Cooper, Carlos Santana, Serena Williams, Stephen Colbert, Kel Mitchell, and Selena Gomez. It can sometimes be in the form of allegory as in the religion in The Chronicles of Narnia, or through plots including those of Christian mythology, like those foretelling of the Second Coming, or tales about knights and holy fighters, i.e. El Cid, Joan of Arc, King Arthur, the Knights of the Round Table, Paladins, or the paladin RPG character class. While others use a "Christian magic" that is "neither allegorical nor topical" such as J. R. R. Tolkien's application of Christianity in Middle-earth found within The Hobbit and The Lord of the Rings.

Distribution

Libraries such as the Library of Congress often categorize each media format under its own genre. Due to mainstream appeal of Christian media, it is distributed at retailers like Hobby Lobby, Walmart, and international technology conglomerates such as Amazon and Tencent. Kosher and halal food brands usually include Christian media within the scope of their advertisement and marketing campaigns, employing slogans like Hebrew National's "we answer to a higher authority" which appeals to consumers throughout the Abrahamic faiths, and restaurant chain The Halal Guys has reached a success with Christian consumers due to similarity with Christian-based brands.

Some companies associate themselves with Christian media; In-N-Out Burger prints Bible verses on their food containers, the name of Tiger Balm and tea distributor Prince of Peace Enterprises, and Chick-fil-A plays Christian music at their restaurants. Advertising managers and agencies categorize Christian media in the same advertising media selection as community marketing, educational entertainment, and Disney-style family-oriented entertainment audiences, including those employed by most major corporations, American Airlines, Bank of America, Coca-Cola, Dairy Queen, Ford, McDonald's, Pepsi, and other multinational corporations, along with locally and regionally relevant target audiences; not to mention other old media and new media funding options, crowdfunding, merchandising, tie-ins, and underwriting.

While there is a prevalence of the Christian media format in popular culture, it is considered to be an alternative to the concentration of media ownership. Certain ideas in Christian culture, which are sometimes overlooked by mainstream outlets, are often given a pulpit through Christian media; this effect has been historically shown during its effectiveness during the civil rights movement and Jesus movement eras.

For many the same reasons as other media outlets, such as the high cost of production and distribution, most Christian publications have switched to digital and streaming media formats. This includes mobile apps, online newspapers, online magazines, video on demand, etc.

Production studios

Christian media studios and publishers range from independent media to mainstream mass media. Many specialize in a particular format, and are noted within their specific field, but some are multimedia production companies. Most major production houses have Christian oriented production studios including Sony's Affirm Films, MGM's Lightworkers Media, NBCUniversal's Big Idea Entertainment, Lionsgate's partner Kingdom Story Company, and 20th Century Studios former Fox Faith. Whereas some production houses simply produce Christian genre productions like they would any other genre, including The Walt Disney Company with their adaption of The Lion, the Witch and the Wardrobe or as with Warner Bros. Discovery throughout their studios such as their acquisition of Warner Alliance and Warner Resound into Warner Music Group proper. Interdenominational independent media studios make up an important part of Christian media, including both small and large scale producers, such as Camfam Studios, Angel Studios, Heaven Sent Gaming, Icon Productions, Mono vs Stereo, and Word Entertainment.

The largest nondenominational television networks, Christian Broadcasting Network (CBN), Trinity Broadcasting Network (TBN), and the Christian productions of Hallmark Channel and GAC Family have media franchises that are regularly considered for broadcast syndication; as do denominational broadcasts by Catholic Vatican Media, or the Seventh-day Adventist related Three Angels Broadcasting Network (3ABN) and LifeTalk Radio. Some of the most watched Christian news programs occur on CBN or TBN, as for print media the most widely regarded Christian news media includes Christianity Today and The Christian Science Monitor, these outlets are archived by The Library of Congress and have been venues for Pulitzer Prize winning journalists, organizations, segments, and articles.

In Japan, several media professionals are graduates of International Christian University. The editor and founder of Christian Today is an alumnus of that university, so is Kaz Hirai who is the former chairman of Sony Group Corporation.

Media franchises

Radio dramas were among the earliest to feature the transmedia storytelling of modern media franchises. The Family Theater of Mutual Broadcasting System and Adventures in Odyssey of Focus on the Family were some of the first successful syndicated broadcasts within Christian media. Family Theater was digitally remastered and continues to be broadcast by EWTN. Adventures in Odyssey, using the naming of Radio Theatre, has made radio adaptions of  Les Miserables, Anne of Green Gables, and The Chronicles of Narnia.

The life of Jesus in the New Testament is portrayed in numerous productions. This includes media formats from rock operas like Jesus Christ Superstar or major film productions. The Jesus Film Project by Cru which has created several films; Jesus (1979) and the My Last Day anime in collaboration with Studio 4°C. A series referred to as the Visual Bible had several adaptions of the Matthew and the Acts of the Apostles, they were called The Visual Bible: Matthew and The Visual Bible: Acts. There were some interactive media mini CDs in the late 1990s which contained trailers and behind the scenes footage of the movies, these clips were later added to DVD releases of the films. Major blockbuster films like The Passion of the Christ have their associated soundtracks released as well. Other Biblical epic series such as the 2013 The Bible miniseries also receive multimedia and social media promotion. The Chosen is a crowdfunded television series about Jesus and the Apostles in the New Testament, the series is directed by Dallas Jenkins and has been adapted into Bible studies, novels by author Jerry B. Jenkins, and children's picture books. The list of actors who have played Jesus in these productions have been Brian Deacon, Bruce Marchiano, Jim Caviezel, Diogo Morgado, and Jonathan Roumie.

Superbook is a 1981 Japanese anime series produced by Tatsunoko Production for Christian Broadcasting Network and TV Tokyo, it was rebooted in 2011 by CBN in collaboration with Asia-based animation studios; the original voice cast included Billie Lou Watt, and for the reboot it includes Sam Vincent, the voice of Edd from Ed, Edd n Eddy and Andrea Libman, the voice of Pinkie Pie from My Little Pony: Friendship Is Magic. In both the original and reboot, the episodes follow a couple of kids, Chris and Joy, and their robot friend named Gizmo. The series is an early example of a modern isekai, as the Superbook teleports the users to various Bible stories.

The VeggieTales direct-to-video series became a media franchise, with recognizable characters including Bob the Tomato voiced by Phil Vischer and Larry the Cucumber voiced by Mike Nawrocki; it has two feature-length films Jonah: A VeggieTales Movie and The Pirates Who Don't Do Anything, Netflix spin-offs VeggieTales in the House and VeggieTales in the City, and the series was rebooted in 2019 by NBCUniversal and Trinity Broadcasting Network as The VeggieTales Show. Phil Vischer documented some of his experience with the show in the novel Me, Myself, and Bob: A True Story About Dreams, God, and Talking Vegetables, he previously hosted a podcast titled The Phil Visher Podcast with Sky Jethani and Christian Taylor, and he now co-hosts The Holy Post.

Left Behind is a series of Second Coming post-apocalyptic novels that had adaptions into graphic novels, film adaptations, and video games. The spin-off novels Left Behind: The Kids follows a format more akin to dystopian fiction, and the video game Left Behind: Eternal Forces is a real-time strategy game.

Bibleman is a 1995 superhero franchise originally produced as a low-budget live-action children's television series, Bibleman: The Animated Series is an ongoing cartoon series started in 2016, the franchise has had numerous action figure depictions, tabletop games, video games, comics, and uniquely Christian tie-ins such as a devotional study Bible. In the series Bibleman's alter-ego was originally Miles Peterson, and his friend Josh Carpenter eventually replaced him as Bibleman, he is joined by fellow heroes Biblegirl and Melody, against the villains Dr. Fear, the Baroness, and the Master of Maybe.

The duck call company Duck Commander has several media productions, and the children of Phil Robertson and Kay Robertson are celebrities associated within Christian media. Their original shows, sponsored by Benelli Armi SpA based on the Duck Commander and Buck Commander brands, were featured on the Outdoor Channel. This sparked interest by A&E to produce the Duck Dynasty television series, which highlighted Willie Robertson and his wife Korie Robertson as they ran their family business, alongside Willie's brother Jase Robertson and Uncle Si Robertson. The show sparked spin-offs including a music album titled Duck the Halls: A Robertson Family Christmas. Duck Commander has their own Duck Call Room podcast featuring Si Robertson with Martin and Godwin, while Blaze Media helps to produce In The Woods with Phil and Unashamed with Phil and Jase, Willie and Korie's daughter Sadie Robertson created the podcast WHOA, That's Good Podcast. Miss Kay released a Duck Commander Kitchen Cookbook, and Phil has released several Christian novels. Si Robertson has an autobiography titled Si-cology 1, and Jase and youngest brother Jep have a 2022 metal detecting television series produced by Fox Nation called Duck Family Treasure.

Media formats

Books, magazines, and newspapers

Evangelicalism doesn't have a central authority, so publishers like Zondervan, LifeWay Christian Resources, and Christianity Today are considered de facto gatekeepers of theology. Christian books are a segment of Christian media which typically communicates the core elements of the Christian faith to non-believers, or publishes books to help develop and inform the beliefs of adherents. While these nondenominational publishers appeal to a wide variety of Christians and non-Christians, there are denomination specific publications including the Catholic Church's America and Seventh-Day Adventist's Amazing Facts. Other publishers include Concordia Publishing House and David C. Cook.

Christian magazines are one of many special-interest categories within the magazine publishing industry. Christian magazines often focus on groups within Christianity, such as men or women, youth, or certain denominations. Many Christian magazines are published by denominations and independent ministries as an outreach to the unchurched or to the organization's supporters, frequently at no cost to the reader. One of the most well known is "Guideposts" magazine, published by Guideposts non-profit since 1945. Examples of denominational magazines include House to House Heart to Heart. Other Christian magazines are published commercially for a profit, and sold by subscription or by single copies through bookstores and other retailers. Examples include Charisma, Relevant, and Spectrum.

Newspapers are a segment of Christian media which typically communicates news to members of the denomination or group which publishes the paper. Such newspapers often published weekly, rarely more frequently and often less frequently (bi-weekly, monthly). Examples include the Southern Baptist Convention, whose various state conventions often publish weekly or bi-weekly newspapers, Christian Examiner and The Christian Post. Sometimes individual congregations will publish newspapers; one example is Southeast Christian Church, a megachurch in Louisville, Kentucky which publishes a weekly newspaper distributed throughout the metro area. Christian Science Monitor is a general interest newspaper that has an appeal beyond Christian audiences, it is owned by the Church of Christ, Scientist. Independent publishers have produced Christian newspapers, often aimed at a specific group such as Roman Catholics.

Poetry produced by Christian poets can often find its way into the popular consciousness, an example includes "Footprints".  Another sub-format is Christian devotional literature which usually has Christian publishers, celebrities, and pastors giving their testimony or sharing ideas, either as Devotional Bibles, Devotional Calendars, or other literary formats. Devotional Bibles are a subgenre of the Study Bible format.

Comics, animation, and graphic novels
Davey and Goliath, Superbook, and VeggieTales are some popular Christian animated series. They were referenced as an inspiration for television writer Len Uhley, regarding X-Men'''s Nightcrawler and Wolverine when the characters' faiths were featured in an episode of the 1990s animated series. Len Uhley later worked on popular Christian animated series Friends and Heroes and the Superbook reboot.The Gospel According to Peanuts, written by Robert L. Short about the comic strip Peanuts by Charles M. Schulz, discussed the Christian themes of the comic strip. In the television special A Charlie Brown Christmas the character Linus Van Pelt would directly quote Luke 2:8-14, with "And there were in the same country shepherds abiding in the field, keeping watch over their flock by night. And, lo, the angel of the Lord came upon them, and the glory of the Lord shone round about them: and they were sore afraid. And the angel said unto them, "Fear not: for, behold, I bring you good tidings of great joy, which shall be to all people. For unto you is born this day in the city of David a Saviour, which is Christ the Lord. And this shall be a sign unto you; Ye shall find the babe wrapped in swaddling clothes, lying in a manger. And suddenly there was with the angel a multitude of the heavenly host praising God, and saying, "Glory to God in the highest, and on earth peace, good will toward men."

Spire Christian Comics, part of Baker Publishing Group and Archie Comics, which ran from 1972 and 1982 were a Christian spin-off of their larger franchises. They featured characters from Archie Andrews, Jughead Jones, Betty Cooper, Veronica Lodge, Sabrina the Teenage Witch, and Josie and the Pussycats.

During the 1990s, Marvel Comics partnered with Thomas Nelson to create a series of Christian themed books including comic book adaptions of The Screwtape Letters, The Pilgrim's Progress, and created a Christian superhero called Illuminator.

Film and television

Many forms of Christian films are widespread, from full length, feature films to short and discussion orientated clips.

Christian television includes broadcast television, cable television, and streaming television channels whose entire broadcast programming schedule is programs directly related to Christianity, such as  Trinity Broadcasting Network (the world's largest religious television network), Three Angels Broadcasting Network, Christian Broadcasting Network, God TV, SAT-7 and Emmanuel TV or individual shows including comedy, action, drama, reality, dramatizations and variety shows, movies and mini-series; which are part of the overall programming of a general-interest television station.

Some Christian streaming services have emerged in the interactive media space, such as PureFlix which is owned by Sony Pictures. Family oriented Christian streaming service Yippee TV received distribution rights for The VeggieTales Show reboot from NBCUniversal Syndication Studios and TBN from 2019 to 2022, and afterward would be broadcast by the Minno streaming service.

Radio and music

Christian radio is a radio format of music and programming that, within itself, includes several sub-formats. These include contemporary Christian music, contemporary worship music, Urban contemporary gospel, Southern Gospel, inspirational music, children's programming which include Adventures in Odyssey and Patch the Pirate, talk radio, and formats which include primarily preaching and/or instructional programming. Christian music festivals and camp meetings are held worldwide including The Experience in Nigeria and Sunza Rock Festival in Japan, and some are sponsored by companies like McDonald's as a part of community outreach including McDonald's Gospelfest, while others are sponsored by churches and Christian music labels like that of Creation Fest.

The American popular music industry first began with the distribution of Christian hymnals and gospel music. The contemporary Christian music of today is still rooted in Christian music and church music, but includes Christian rock and Christian hip hop music. Christian and Gospel record labels are usually founded by artists within the field. TobyMac started the label Gotee Records and Lacrae is the founder of Reach Records. Musicians in Christian music groups often have prominent solo careers as well, Michael Tait wrote the book Living Under God with former DC Talk bandmate TobyMac. Fred Hammond started out with the Commissioned gospel music group, and has become one of the most influential contemporary gospel musicians. Some secular musicians convert to Christian music, Carlos Santana known for his Latin rock music infused Latin Christian music into the sound following his conversion in the early 1970s, Kanye West with his Sunday Service Choir have had success with a single called "Jesus Walks" and the music albums Jesus Is King and Jesus Is Born, and Korn band member Brian Welch has a Christian metal band called Love and Death.

Video games and interactive media

One of the first Christian video games was Bible Computer Games which first appeared on the TRS-80 Color Computer in 1982, it was ported in 1983 to Timex Sinclair and TI-99/4A, then released on the Apple IIe, Commodore 64, VIC-20, and the Kaypro CP/M computer platforms in 1984, and finally on MS-DOS 1986 by PC Enterprises. Many of the early Christian video games have become highly valued collectables, because they received smaller distribution at Christian bookstores and magazines instead of typical distribution at video game retailers, one such example is the 1983 Atari 2600 title Red Sea Crossing which has become one of the rarest video games of all time. During the late 1980s and early 1990s, video game developer Wisdom Tree made several unlicensed video games for the Nintendo Entertainment System and Super Nintendo that have since been ported to numerous platforms, including Spiritual Warfare and Super 3D Noah's Ark. The MS-DOS Wisdom Tree games were brought to Steam by Piko Interactive using DOSBox and a Wolfenstein 3D source port.

While Christian video games may have at first been misunderstood by the video game industry, the topic of religion and video games has since been accepted as a part of the mainline video game culture. Major Triple-A media franchises, including The Legend of Zelda, Castlevania, Assassin's Creed, and Halo, prominently feature Christian concepts to varying degrees. Crave Entertainment had VeggieTales video games officially released on PlayStation 2 and Game Boy Advance, a game based on reality show Duck Dynasty was published by Activision on PlayStation 4, Xbox One, and Nintendo 3DS. The video game adaptions of The Lord of the Rings film series titles The Two Towers and The Return of the King, and The Chronicles of Narnia: The Lion, the Witch and the Wardrobe video game, became Nintendo Player's Choice, PlayStation Greatest Hits, and Xbox Platinum Hits. Christian game developer Scott Cawthon launched a major success outside of the Christian media field with the survival horror series Five Nights at Freddy's. Games with Christian themes, like That Dragon, Cancer, have even become examples of video games as an art form.

Christian interactive media includes Biblical software such as YouVersion's Bible mobile app, The SWORD Project, and Logos Bible Software, along with various forms of church software, as well as websites such as BibleGateway.com and Crosswalk.com.

 Sub-formats 

 Holidays 

 Christmas 
Christmas media is a well known sub-format, including its own films, television specials, music, and literature. The Nativity of Jesus is depicted in art, scenes, and plays. Characters including the Christmas gift-bringer especially Santa Claus are common within the film format, as are related additional characters like Mrs. Claus and Rudolph the Red-Nosed Reindeer. Various Christmas stories have inspired other fictional works, such as A Christmas Carol's Ebenezer Scrooge being the original inspiration for Scrooge McDuck, a cornerstone of Disney's Mickey Mouse universe related Donald Duck universe, with Christian messaging still featured for McDuck focused productions Mickey's Christmas Carol, DuckTales and the DuckTales 2017 reboot.

 Easter 
The Resurrection of Jesus is a common motif in works of art, and other themes are explored in Easter films and television episodes. The Easter Bunny, Easter eggs, and Easter baskets are universal icons of the holiday, due in large part to Christian media.

 Halloween 
Several works of fiction, film, and television specials center around Halloween, and its associated All Saints' Day, Allhallowtide, All Souls' Day, and Day of the Dead. Its original intent was to celebrate the anticipated Second Coming and a jubilant prayer for the dead, and to celebrate the lives and works of saints, the apostles, disciples, and one's interpersonal relationships. Halloween costumes were originally from Celtic Christianity and were based on Christian mythology and folklore, they have since come to encompass supernatural fiction. Horror fiction has some of its roots in Halloween fiction story The Legend of Sleepy Hollow, as do horror's later multimedia adaptions to comics, film, and video games.

 Televangelism 

Televangelism is a popular sub-format that usually features sermons by television hosts like Pat Robertson of Christian Broadcasting Network in Virginia Beach, author Joyce Meyer, and preachers including Joel Osteen of Lakewood Church in Houston, the televangelism sub-format can include radio rebroadcasts including those of Bishop T. D. Jakes of The Potter's House Church in Dallas and Pastor Skip Heitzig of Calvary Chapel in Albuquerque. During the late 1990s to the early 2000s, Jakes along with pastors Eddie Long and Creflo Dollar had three of the largest churches and television audiences in America.

While there are many benefits to this popular sub-format, as most televangelism broadcasts are simply sermons and theological seminars, there are controversies involving Word of Faith-style prosperity theology, including a senate probe that led to an investigation of six televangelists. Several popular televangelists and preachers have shunned the use of prosperity theology, and instead rely on traditional means of funding for their ministries.

 Impact 
 Themes 
There is a misconception of Christian media being a form of proselytism and extremism. The concerns are taken very seriously within the field, as it is not the intent or goal of the genre, and the issues are combatted by those within both the Christian and secular media industries. ,  The common intent and goal behind most Christian media is often that "entertainment doesn't have to be shallow and devoid of meaning ... values-based media can still be entertaining and engaging." According to the former head of Religion and Ethics for the BBC, Michael Wakelin, "journalists often assume that they understand Christianity simply because of its popularity. As a result, reporters are often more willing to 'take swipes' at Christianity in newspaper and television reports, while other religions are treated with more caution." Another concern of the genre is a perceived secularization of religion and the McDonaldization of reducing faith to a fad, which are similar to criticisms of various approaches to evangelism and mass media in general.

Most criticism about Christian media comes from the prior misconceptions and concerns, and when it isn't a blockbuster it often receives the same criticisms as other independent and low-budget media due to the typically subculture nature of the productions, but as such it likewise receives the same types of cult followings as other mainstream fandoms and sleeper hits in small press, independent music, cult film, and indie games. Despite the decline of Christianity in the Western world the genre has shown resilience giving Christian culture prominence within global popular culture, and even increased the number of those identifying as Christians regardless of church attendance. Much of this approach was mimicked by technology evangelists to improve the perception of technology in the Information Age. Which in turn inspired the digital spread of the gospel with virtual accessibility of the ministry of Jesus, causing the growth of personal Bible studies, Christian contemplation and Christian meditation.

Christian media has a broad demographic reach. Asian peoples, African Americans, indigenous peoples of the Americas, women, Hispanic and Latino Americans, within nondenominationalism/evangelicalism are among the fastest growing audiences and creatives of Christian media, and this is reflected in the popularity of Christian leaders across the growing panethnic Christian population. These leaders include Renee Begay, Kristina Button, Francis Chan, Roma Downey, Layla de la Garza, T. D. Jakes, Sarah Jakes Roberts, Mario Lucero, Isabel Lucero, Kel Mitchell, Joseph Prince, Siouxsan Robinson, Samuel Rodriguez, Michael Todd, CeCe Winans, Randy Woodley, and Danny Yamashiro.

Society
The genre is influential within American conservatism, but because creatives with both conservative and liberal viewpoints are involved with media productions, the most common stance is "taking the conservative theological position but a definite liberal approach to social problems" as per Christianity Today. A side-effect of that is Christian media outlets being well known for their journalistic objectivity, ethics, and standards, and research has found that independent and Christian media publications help in government accountability, exposing corruption, and encouraging the separation of church and state. The media industry in general has an issue with sexual harassment and sexual assault and much of it goes unpublicized at secular institutions; preventing such corruption at Christian media organizations, Christian outlets even self-report the appearance of impropriety to help repair and prevent such issues.

Influential leaders in Christian media were at the forefront in fighting against racial segregation in the United States, and it has continued to lead in the topic of Christian egalitarianism and feminism; women in the Bible are depicted in Christian media, ranging from prophetess Miriam, Israelite judge Deborah, queen Esther, to the women in Church history such as Mary Magdalene, Saint Joanna, and Susanna, and married couple Priscilla and Aquila. Their stories are common subjects dating back to Christian literature in the 1550s onward. Women in Christianity play important roles in Christian media, including musicians Aretha Franklin, Amy Grant and Faith Hill, as well as businesswomen J.D. Dewitt, Robin McLain, and Sadie Robertson. The Handmaid's Tale, by author Margaret Atwood, warns of a disregard for egalitarianism, fictional televangelist Serena Joy manipulates complementarianism to help build the dystopian government in the story.

Christian denominations are taking various stances on homosexuality or sexual orientation and some Christian denominations affirm LGBT people, so the same is happening within Christian media as well. There are some LGBT Christians that have had success in the Christian music field, those include Semler, Jennifer Knapp, Everyday Sunday frontman Trey Pearson, and Vicky Beeching. LGBT Christian media personalities differ heavily from the mainstream media portrayal of LGBT people, in that the Christian LGBT community focuses on agape, the love of God and love of Christ, particularly encouraging committed relationships and opposing promiscuity while moreover strictly denouncing hookup culture. Christianity has a complicated history with the LGBT community, once ostracized leaders like Lonnie Frisbee have began to receive positive portrayals, including in the 2023 film Jesus Revolution which covers his pivotal role in the hippie Jesus movement of the 1960s and 1970s.

Lesbianism in Christianity was an influential topic in the early church. Sappho's poetry and Sapphic stanza positively impacted the writings of Christianity in the 1st century and in the ante-Nicene period, after the Renaissance the topic began to be further explored with Christian literature discussing lesbian experiences of women in Christianity, including nuns and ministers/clergy.

 Pop culture 

Like most pop culture and subculture movements, Christian media personalities and businesses have been the subject of feature stories and been featured on talk shows such as breakfast television and late-night shows. One of the earliest pop worship groups The Joystrings first gained popularity performing on Cliff Michelmore's BBC Tonight, a trend which continued with other night programs; Christian rock band Relient K made appearances on The Tonight Show with Jay Leno, and celebrities like those from Duck Dynasty made appearances on Jimmy Kimmel Live! and Conan.

In The Simpsons there are recurring characters that are usually used to discuss and parody Christian topics, those being Ned Flanders and Reverend Lovejoy. Some episodes parody Christian media concepts, such as "Sky Police" which references Church Team, a Christian card counting blackjack team.

Japanese manga and anime franchise Trigun covers numerous Christian themes throughout its story. The main character Vash the Stampede differentiates himself from other outlaw Western heroes by attempting to not kill, the show also features a Christian priest named Nicholas D. Wolfwood.King of the Hill parodies both the positive and negative impacts of Christian media. A recurring fictional Christian media franchise called The Manger Babies, created by the character Luanne Platter from hand puppets she found at a yard sale in the season 2 episode "Meet the Manger Babies". The characters of the fictional series were Obadiah the Donkey, Hosea the Cat, Gurgle Gurgle the Octopus, and Sir Reginald Featherbottom III the Penguin. While Luanne's Christian media series is shown positively in all the episodes it appears in, in the season 8 episode "Reborn to Be Wild" it focuses on a Christian hardcore band and Hank warns his son Bobby about treating faith like a fad.South Park had several episodes that parodied Christian media topics. One comparing Mel Gibson to Daffy Duck following the success of Passion of the Christ, another about fictional Christian rock band called Faith Plus One, and both Jesus and Satan are recurring characters; in South Park episodes that feature Jesus or Satan, the show pays homage to Christian media story-telling by teaching some type of Christian virtue. Matt Stone and Trey Parker included an episode in South Park about Mormonism, and later produced a Broadway theatre musical The Book of Mormon to both parody and pay homage to Christian missionaries and particularly Mormon missionaries.Futurama had an episode entitled "Godfellas" which is the first win for an animation with the Writers Guild of America Award, for tackling deep theological and religious topics. Including a science fiction take on the idea of predestination, grace, repentance, and salvation from a Judeo-Christian perspective.

Animated series Clone High features a clone of Jesus named Jesús Cristo. In the episode "A.D.D.: The Last 'D' is for Disorder", the clone of Joan of Arc asks for his advice after she begins hearing religious voices. It turns out to be a Christian radio station, which she was accidentally picking up on her bent retainer wire. The episode centered on Christian ideas related to persecution and tolerance.

The show Drawn Together was a cartoon which parodied most animation genres and styles, for the Christian genre they parodied the VeggieTales characters as extremists called The VeggieFables.

Japanese manga franchise Saint Young Men is about Jesus and Buddha becoming roommates in modern Tokyo. The series has been successfully adapted from its manga to anime, film, and dramas. It has been praised by religious scholars, as the manga contained well-researched theological humor and was respectful to the source faiths. Christian media and art was also a primary influence, as was Buddhist art and contemporary Buddhist culture.

In the Rick and Morty episode "Never Ricking Morty" the characters of Rick Sanchez and Morty Smith both repent and turn to Jesus, at which point a imaginary version of Jesus and various Christian media character parodies rescue them. The imaginary Jesus character later returns as self-referential humor in Season 6, Episode 7 "Full Meta Jackrick".

The season 1 series finale of Smiling Friends parodied the Divine Comedy'', particularly Dante's Inferno, as the character Charlie must make the devil smile in order to be return to Earth; Charlie fails to make the devil smile in the end but God, played by Gilbert Godfried, saves Charlie for having confronting fears.

References

Sources
 

 
Christian culture
Fiction by genre
Genres
Radio formats
Media formats